Tavakkolabad-e Do may refer to:
Tavakkolabad-e Do, Rigan